Isa Tarsah Kelemechi (Mongolian: Isa Khelmerchi (Isa the Interpreter); Chinese: Ai-hsüeh) was an Assyrian Nestorian Christian scientist, and official at the Yuan court of Kublai Khan's Mongol Empire in the 13th century.

Astrologer in China
Isa Kelemechi was named head of the "Office of Western Astronomy" established by the Mongol ruler Kubilai Khan in 1263 to study Muslim astronomical observations. Kubilai would establish a second Observatory for Islamic astronomy in 1271, directed by astronomer Jamal al-Din.

Isa Kelemechi was also instrumental in reinforcing anti-Muslim prohibitions in the Mongol realms, such as prohibiting halal slaughter and circumcision, and, according to Rashid al-Din encouraged denunciation of Muslims. Isa Kelemechi also showed to Khubilai the Muslim precept of "Kill the polytheists, all of them", raising the suspicion of the Mongols towards Muslims. According to Rashid al-Din, as a result "most Muslims left Khitai".

Diplomat to Europe

Isa Kelemechi was later a member of the first mission to Europe sent by the Mongol Il-Khan ruler Arghun in 1285. He met with Pope Honorius IV, remitting a letter from Ghazan offering to "remove" the Saracens and divide "the land of Sham, namely Egypt" with the Franks. The message, written in imperfect Latin, said:

The 1285 embassy would be followed in 1287 by that of Rabban bar Sauma.

See also
 Franco-Mongol alliance

Notes

Ambassadors to the Mongol Empire
Nestorians
Year of death missing
Year of birth missing
13th-century scientists
13th-century astronomers
Mongol Empire Christians
Mongol Empire scholars
13th-century diplomats